The Information & Public Relations Department (I & PRD) is an agency within the Government of Kerala. It is charged with "disseminating information on various activities of the Government to the people through the media and providing feedback to the Government on important matters reflected in the media. I & PRD is also charged with activities connected with cultural affairs."

External links
 Kerala Information & Public Relations Department

Government departments of Kerala